Ágnes Hornyák (formerly Ágnes Boczkó-Hornyák; born 2 September 1982 in Mátészalka) is a retired Hungarian team handball player.

She mader her international debut against Norway on 2 March 2005. She participated on the World Championship yet in that year and captured a bronze medal. She took part on another World Championship in 2007, and represented Hungary on two European Championships in 2006 and 2008.

She was also a member of the team that finished fourth at the 2008 Summer Olympics in China.

She was married to world champion fencer, Gábor Boczkó. She gave birth to their son, Áron in April 2013.

Achievements
Nemzeti Bajnokság I:
Winner: 2008, 2009, 2010, 2011, 2012, 2013, 2014
Silver Medalist: 2007, 2015
Magyar Kupa:
Winner: 2002, 2007, 2008, 2009, 2010, 2011, 2012, 2013, 2014, 2015
EHF Champions League:
Winner: 2013, 2014
Finalist: 2009, 2012
Semifinalist: 2007, 2008, 2010, 2011
World Championship:
Bronze Medalist: 2005
World University Championship:
Winner: 2010

References

External links
 Ágnes Hornyák player profile on Győri Audi ETO KC Official Website
 Ágnes Hornyák career statistics at Worldhandball
 
 
 
 

1982 births
Living people
People from Mátészalka
Hungarian female handball players
Handball players at the 2008 Summer Olympics
Olympic handball players of Hungary
Győri Audi ETO KC players
Expatriate handball players
Hungarian expatriates in France
Sportspeople from Szabolcs-Szatmár-Bereg County
21st-century Hungarian women